"Droit dans le soleil" is the debut single of the French musical duo Détroit. It was released on Barclay Records and distributed by Universal Music. The single is a prelude to the debut album of the duo Horizons due on 18 November 2013. The song is written by the duo members Bertrand Cantat and Pascal Humbert and by Lebanese-Quebec artist Wajdi Mouawad after Mouawad cooperated with them in the album release Chœurs relating to his theatrical work Le Cycle des Femmes: Trois histoires de Sophocle. The single was recorded in Vega Studio in France and was produced by Cantat, Humbert and Bruno Green.

Charts

References

2013 singles
French-language songs
2013 songs
Barclay (record label) singles